The Young Lions Fiction Award is an annual US literary prize of $10,000, awarded to a writer who is 35 years old or younger for a novel or collection of short stories. The award was established in 2001 by Ethan Hawke, Jennifer Rudolph Walsh, Rick Moody, Hannah McFarland, and the New York Public Library. Each year, five young fiction writers are selected as finalists by a reading committee of Young Lions members (a New York Public Library membership aimed at people in their 20s and 30s), writers, editors, and librarians. A panel of judges selects the winner.

Recipients

References 

American literary awards
Awards established in 2001
Awards with age limits